The American Association was a Minor League Baseball league that operated primarily in the Midwestern and South Central United States from 1902 to 1962 and 1969 to 1997. Over that 90-year span, its teams relocated, changed names, transferred to different leagues, or ceased operations altogether. This list documents teams which played in the league.

Teams

Map

See also

List of International League teams
List of Pacific Coast League teams

References

External links

 Teams
American Association teams
 Teams
American Association